Thomas George Cairnes Jameson (6 April 1908 – 18 January 1987) was an English first-class cricketer who represented Hampshire in three first-class matches in 1930 and 1931. As well as playing for Hampshire, Jameson also represented the Royal Navy in first-class matches against the Royal Air Force and the Army.

Jameson died in Henley-on-Thames, Oxfordshire on 18 January 1987.

External links
Thomas Jameson at Cricinfo
Thomas Jameson at CricketArchive

Bihar cricketers
English cricketers
Hampshire cricketers
Royal Navy cricketers
1908 births
1989 deaths